Michael Andrew Comber (born 26 October 1989) was an English cricketer from Clacton-on-Sea, Essex. He attended Clacton County High School. 

Michael was a medium paced bowler and batsmen who played for Essex County Cricket Club before being released at the end of the 2012 season. He began his career at Clacton Cricket Club.

References

1989 births
Living people
English cricketers
Suffolk cricketers
Essex cricketers